Stanislaus National Forest is a U.S. National Forest which manages  of land in four counties in the Sierra Nevada in Northern California. It was established on February 22, 1897, making it one of the oldest national forests. It was named after the Stanislaus River.

Geography

The forest is located primarily in eastern Tuolumne County, adjacent to the northwestern part of Yosemite National Park, but parts of it extend (in descending order of forestland area) into Southern Alpine County, Northern Mariposa County and Eastern Calaveras County. Forest headquarters are located in Sonora, California. There are local ranger district offices in Groveland, Hathaway Pines, and Pinecrest.

The Emigrant Wilderness is located entirely within its boundaries.  Portions of the Carson-Iceberg Wilderness, including the Dardanelles Cone, and the Mokelumne Wilderness are also within the Stanislaus National Forest.

Features

Recreation
The proximity of the Stanislaus National Forest to the San Francisco Bay Area makes it a popular recreation destination. The volcanic and granite formations in the wilderness exist alongside heavy cattle grazing. Whitewater rafting and kayaking can be found in the wild and scenic Tuolumne River and Cherry Creek. Other rivers flowing out of the Stanislaus include the Clavey River, the Stanislaus River, as well as the Merced River along the southern boundary.

Two ski resorts, Dodge Ridge and Bear Valley, operate here under a special use permit.

2013 Rim Fire 
The Rim Fire was ignited on the Stanislaus National Forest in August 2013, and eventually grew to become the third-largest fire in California history. The fire was named after the Rim of the World Vista on California State Route 120, where the fire was initially reported.

See also
 Ecology of the Sierra Nevada
 List of plants of the Sierra Nevada (U.S.)
 :Category:Fauna of the Sierra Nevada (United States)
 Calaveras Big Tree National Forest - historical

References

External links
 official Stanislaus National Forest website
Columns of the Giants, Stanislaus National Forest, USDA Forest Service website

 
National Forests of California
Protected areas of the Sierra Nevada (United States)
Protected areas of Alpine County, California
Protected areas of Calaveras County, California
Protected areas of Mariposa County, California
Protected areas of Tuolumne County, California
Sonora, California
Biosphere reserves of the United States
1897 establishments in California
Protected areas established in 1897